The Mount Creek is a river North Andros, the Bahamas.

See also
List of rivers of the Bahamas

References

GeoNames

Rivers of the Bahamas